Sacred Heart School is a private, Roman Catholic high school in Ville Platte, Louisiana.  It is located in the Roman Catholic Diocese of Lafayette.

It is the only Catholic school in Evangeline Parish.

History
The Sisters of Mount Carmel opened the school in 1913. A poor area economy forced the school to close in 1928 but it reopened in September 1931 due to efforts from Father J. Maurice Bourgeois.

In May 2015 a group of parents protested, asking for the school to remove principal Dianne Fontenot, complaining about a decrease in student enrollment and excessive firing of personnel.

Campus
The school has a high school and elementary school section. Both the elementary and high school each house administrative offices and a chapel. The high school chapel has a confessional, and the high school has 13 classrooms, a library, a science laboratory, a commons area, a dining area, and a gymnasium. The elementary school has 24 classrooms, two libraries, a gymnasium, a cafeteria, and a science laboratory.

Student body
 the school had 718 students in grades K-12, with 464 of them in K-8 and 254 in high school. As of 2014 students originated from Ville Platte, Bunkie, Grand Prairie, Mamou, Opelousas, Pine Prairie, Vidrine, Washington, and Whiteville.

Accreditation
Sacred Heart of Jesus Catholic School is accredited by AdvancED.
AdvancED is the unified organization of the North Central Association Commission on Accreditation and School Improvement (NCA CASI), Southern Association of Colleges and Schools Council on Accreditation and School Improvement (SACS CASI), and Commission on International and Transregional Accreditation (CITA).

Athletics
Sacred Heart athletics competes in the LHSAA.

Championships
Football Championships
(1) State Championship: 1967

Football
Sacred Heart and Ville Platte High School, since 2000, regularly play each other in the Tee Cotton Bowl. Jeré Longman of The New York Times stated that this game was created as a "unifying civic gesture".

Notable alumni
 Danny Ardoin, Former MLB player (Minnesota Twins, Texas Rangers, Colorado Rockies, Baltimore Orioles, Los Angeles Dodgers)
 Bernard LeBas (Class of 1961), Democratic member of the Louisiana House of Representatives for District 38 for Evangeline and St. Landry parishes since 2008

Notes and references

External links
 School Website
 Parish Website

Catholic secondary schools in Louisiana
Schools in Evangeline Parish, Louisiana
Educational institutions established in 1913
Private middle schools in Louisiana
Private elementary schools in Louisiana
1913 establishments in Louisiana